Roberto Malinow. M.D., Ph.D. is an Argentinian-born American neuroscientist at the University of California, San Diego. He is currently a distinguished professor of neurobiology and neurosciences, and holds the Shiley Chair in Alzheimer's Disease Research at UCSD. In 2012 Dr. Malinow was elected to the National Academy of Sciences (Cellular and molecular neuroscience)  and in 2015 was elected to the National Academy of Medicine.

Malinow has a prolific scientific publication record, and his works have been cited over 25,000 times. For comparison, a scientist in the field of molecular biology & genetics has to receive approximately 1229 citations to be among the most cited 1% of life scientists in the world (see h-index by discipline). Further, he has contributed many 'high-impact' neuroscience articles, with an h-index of 72 (72 research publications with at least 72 citations each), regarded as "truly unique".

References

1956 births
Living people
American neuroscientists
University of California, San Diego faculty
Members of the National Academy of Medicine
Members of the United States National Academy of Sciences